Chahe is a town in Qixingguan District, Bijie, Guizhou. , it administers the following eight residential communities and seven villages:
Chahe Community 
Tangfeng Community
Wangjiaba Community
Qiaobian Community
Shuanghua Community
Dazhai Community
Chensi Community
Zuna Community
Yile Village
Mulai Village
Gele Village
Fayin Village
Falu Village
Qianzhai Village
Shalang Village

References

Bijie
Towns in Guizhou